Masterton was a New Zealand electorate from 1887 to 1946, focused on the town of Masterton and the surrounding area.

Population centres
In the 1887 electoral redistribution, although the Representation Commission was required through the Representation Act 1887 to maintain existing electorates "as far as possible", rapid population growth in the North Island required the transfer of three seats from the South Island to the north. Ten new electorates were created, including Masterton, and one former electorate was recreated.

The Masterton electorate's boundaries were roughly based on those of the Wairarapa North electorate that it replaced, although it was not an exact match. The electorate ran from the Tararua Ranges down to the sea, with its northern boundary just north of Eketahuna and its southern boundary just south of the largest Wairarapa town of Masterton.

The 1890 election saw the electorate gain Pahiatua and Woodville, but lose territory on the coast south of Castlepoint. At the 1893 elections, it lost Woodville, and in the 1896 election, it lost Pahiatua. In the 1911 election, it lost Castlepoint, leaving it almost landlocked.

History
The electorate of Masterton was created for the 1887 general election. It was represented by five Members of Parliament.

The electorate was abolished in 1946; the town of Masterton itself was moved to the Wairarapa electorate, while the rest was moved to the Pahiatua electorate.

Election results
Key

Election results

1943 election

1938 election

1935 election

1931 election

1928 election

1899 election

1893 election

1890 election

Notes

References

Historical electorates of New Zealand
Politics of the Wellington Region
Wairarapa
1887 establishments in New Zealand
1946 disestablishments in New Zealand